Vimodrone is a suburban station on Line 2 of the Milan Metro in the municipality of Vimodrone.

History
The station was opened in 1968, and initially was a stop on the Milan-Gorgonzola fast tramway line. Since 4 December 1972 the section from Cascina Gobba to Gorgonzola, where this station is located, was connected to Milan Metro Line 2 and has operated as part of it ever since.

Station structure 

The station has two covered platforms and two tracks. The passenger building is located on either side of the tracks, at the western end of the platforms. The station is built in the trench of an old bed of the Naviglio Martesana channel, diverted approximately 200 meters to the north.

References

Bibliography
 Renzo Marini, Le ferrovie dell'Adda, in "Ingegneria Ferroviaria", Apr 1968, pp. 345–348.
 Giovanni Cornolò, Fuori porta in tram. Le tranvie extraurbane milanesi, Parma, Ermanno Arbertelli, 1980.

Line 2 (Milan Metro) stations
Railway stations opened in 1981
1981 establishments in Italy
Railway stations in Italy opened in the 20th century